Savanes is the northernmost of the five Regions of Togo. Dapaong is the regional capital.  Another major town in the region is Mango.

Savanes is divided into the prefectures of Cinkassé, Kpendjal, Oti, Tandjouaré, and Tône.

To the south of Savanes is Kara Region, its only domestic border.  It shares borders with the following foreign areas:
Northern Region, Ghana: southwest
Upper East Region, Ghana: west
Boulgou Province, Burkina Faso: far northwest
Koulpélogo Province, Burkina Faso: northwest
Kompienga Province, Burkina Faso: northeast
Atakora Department, Benin: east
Savanes is the only region that borders Burkina Faso.

See also
 Regions of Togo

References

 
Regions of Togo